Ifeoma Okoye  (possibly born in 1937) is a Nigerian novelist. She has been referred to by fans as "the most important female novelist from Nigeria after Flora Nwapa and Buchi Emecheta," according to Oyekan Owomoyela. She was born in Anambra State in Eastern Region, Nigeria. She went to school at St. Monica's College in Ogbunike to receive a teaching certificate in 1959. She then graduated from the University of Nigeria in Nsukka to earn a Bachelor of Arts honours degree in English in 1977. She wrote novels including Behind the Clouds, children's novels and short stories, such as The Village Boy  and Eme Goes to School.

Early life and education

Ifeoma Okoye was possibly born in 1937 in Anambra State, Nigeria - the actual date she was born is unknown. She went to school at St. Monica's College in Ogbunike and earned a teaching certificate. She then taught at St. Monica's college for two years. During the years of 1963 to 1967, she attended All Saints International School in Enugu. She ran her own nursery school in Enugu from 1971 to 1974. From 1974 to 1977, Okoye went to study at the University of Nigeria, Nsukka, where she earned her Bachelor of Arts in English. From 1986 to 1987, she studied at Aston University in England, where she obtained a postgraduate degree in English. Later, she taught English at Nnamdi Azikiwe University until 2000.

Accomplishments
Although Okoye was known for her children's short stories, she also wrote some books for adults, such as Behind the Clouds. Behind the Clouds was about a couple who fails to have children, and how the blame mainly falls on the woman instead of the man. Okoye received prizes for both Behind the Cloud and The Village Boy from the Nigerian National Council of Art and Culture in 1983, along with earning the best fiction of the year award for the novel Men Without Ears, in 1984.  In 1985, she received another award for Daily Bread after Eze at the Ife National Book Fair. She was also the African Regional Winner for the Commonwealth Short Story Competition in 1999.

Major works
Okoye's writing career began after her years in education. She wrote short stories and novels. While the majority of her works were short stories for children, she also wrote some novels for adults.

 
 
The Power of a Plate of Rice. circa 2011.
 
 
 

 
 
  
 
 
Busy Bee Number Workbook. 1980.

Eme Goes to School. 1979.

See also

Nigerian woman novelists
 Chimamanda Ngozi Adichie
 Buchi Emecheta
 Flora Nwapa
 Karen King-Aribisala
 Adaobi Tricia Nwaubani
 Chidera Okolie
 Taiwo Odubiyi
 Adaora Lily Ulasi
 Akachi Adimora-Ezeigbo
 Nnedi Okorafor
 Chika Unigwe
 Sefi Atta
 Helen Oyeyemi
 Chinelo Okparanta
 Lola Shoneyin
 Chibundu Onuzo
 Kaine Agary

References

Further reading
 
 

Living people
Nigerian women novelists
Academics of Aston University
University of Nigeria alumni
Academic staff of Nnamdi Azikiwe University
1937 births
British women children's writers
Nigerian schoolteachers
People from Anambra State
Nigerian women academics
20th-century British women writers
21st-century British women writers
20th-century Nigerian novelists
21st-century Nigerian novelists